"Stinking Rich" is a song recorded by British rappers MoStack and J Hus featuring British rapper Dave that appears on MoStack's debut studio album Stacko. The song was written by MoStack, J Hus, Dave, and Darius Forde and James Grant (also known as iLL BLU), and produced by iLL BLU.

Commercially, the song reached the top 20 in the United Kingdom and top 100 in Ireland.

Charts

References

2019 songs
MoStack songs
Dave (rapper) songs
J Hus songs
Songs written by Dave (rapper)
Songs written by J Hus
Songs written by MoStack